Samson James Froling (born 10 February 2000) is an Australian professional basketball player for the Illawarra Hawks of the National Basketball League (NBL). Froling played college basketball for the Creighton Bluejays for one season before leaving to play basketball in Australia professionally.

College career
In January 2018, Froling committed to play college basketball for the Creighton Bluejays after receiving offers from programs including Wichita State, Arizona and Maryland. In 30 games for Creighton during the 2018–19 season, Froling averaged 3.6 points and 1.9 rebounds in 8.9 minutes a game. On 1 April 2019, Froling announced he would be leaving Creighton to pursue professional opportunities in Australia.

Professional career
On the same day as announcing he had left Creighton, Froling was listed on the roster for the Dandenong Rangers of the Australian semi-professional league NBL1. In 16 games for the Rangers during the league's inaugural 2019 season, Froling averaged 16.9 points and 7.6 rebounds a game.

On 6 May 2019, Froling signed a three-year deal with the Illawarra Hawks of the NBL. His remaining contract with Illawarra was voided when the club was liquidated on 18 May 2020.

On 22 July 2020, Froling re-signed with the Hawks on a new two-year deal. He re-signed to a new three-year deal on 25 February 2022.

Career statistics

College

|-
| style="text-align:left;"| 2018–19
| style="text-align:left;"| Creighton
| 30 || 0 || 9.2 || .576 || .250 || .385 || 1.9 || .5 || .1 || .4 || 3.6

Personal life
Froling was born in Townsville, Queensland, to Shane and Jenny Froling as the youngest of four siblings. His father played in the NBL for twenty years, while his mother was a four-time champion in the Women's National Basketball League (WNBL). His sisters, Alicia and Keely, have played together in the WNBL, while his brother, Harry Froling, plays in the NBL for the Brisbane Bullets.

References

External links
NBL profile
College statistics

2000 births
Living people
Australian expatriate basketball people in the United States
Australian Institute of Sport basketball players
Australian men's basketball players
Centers (basketball)
Creighton Bluejays men's basketball players
Illawarra Hawks players
Power forwards (basketball)